The 1941–42 William & Mary Indians men's basketball team represented the College of William & Mary in intercollegiate basketball during the 1941–42 NCAA men's basketball season. Under the third year of head coach Dwight Steussey, the team finished the season 15–9 and 8–4 in the Southern Conference. This was the 37th season of the collegiate basketball program at William & Mary, whose nickname is now the Tribe.

The Indians finished in a tie for 5th place in the conference and qualified for the 1942 Southern Conference men's basketball tournament hosted by North Carolina State University at the Thompson Gym in Raleigh, North Carolina. For the second straight season, the Indians won their first-round game (against George Washington) before falling in the semifinal round (against hosts NC State).

The Indians played two teams for the first time this season: Fordham and Villanova.

Schedule

|-
!colspan=9 style="background:#006400; color:#FFD700;"| Regular season

|-
!colspan=9 style="background:#006400; color:#FFD700;"| Southern Conference Tournament

Source

References

William & Mary Tribe men's basketball seasons
William and Mary Indians
William and Mary Indians Men's Basketball Team
William and Mary Indians Men's Basketball Team